Daniel "Danny" Krueger is an American competitive swimmer who specializes in freestyle events. He is a three-time medalist at the World Junior Championships. Krueger competes collegiately for the University of Texas at Austin where he is a three-time NCAA Champion, a nine-time All-American, a seventeen-time Big 12 champion, and a 2019, 2020 & 2021 CSCAA Scholar All-American. After the 2020 season and the cancellation of the 2020 NCAA Division I Men's Swimming and Diving Championships, Krueger was named the Big 12 Conference Swimmer of the Year as a sophomore. In 2021 Krueger was named Big 12 Conference Scholar-Athlete of the Year.

See also
 NCAA Division I Men's Swimming and Diving Championships
 Texas Longhorns swimming and diving
 Texas Longhorns

References

Living people
American male freestyle swimmers
Texas Longhorns men's swimmers
Year of birth missing (living people)